Kamara Kattu is a 2015 Indian Tamil-language romantic  horror film directed by Ramki Ramakrishnan and starring Yuvan, Sree Raam, Raksha Raj and Manishajith.

Cast

Production 
The director also worked as an art director and lyricist for the film.

Soundtrack 
The songs were composed by F. S. Faizal. He sang two songs with his friend Gana Bala. Janani, who trained under Ramya NSK sang four songs.
"Erumattu Payale" - Santhosh, Vandhana Srinivasan
"En Kadhal Pichukichu" - Gana Bala, F. S. Faisal
"Jollu Vittu" - Gana Bala, F. S. Faisal
"Unnai Ennai" - Santhosh
"Gethu Poiyyada" - Mano

Release 
The Times of India gave the film a rating of one-and-a-half out of five stars and wrote that " This so-bad-it’s-good quality is the film’s biggest strength or rather, it’s only strength". A critic from The New Indian Express said that "The screenplay and its treatment lack appeal and the film is neither funny nor horrifying". On the contrary, Maalaimalar praised the performances of the cast, the music, and the cinematography.

References

External links 

2015 horror films
Indian romantic horror films
2010s Tamil-language films